The NS 3300 was a series of goods steam locomotives of the Dutch Railways (NS) and its predecessor Hollandsche IJzeren Spoorweg-Maatschappij (HSM).

After the success of the goods locomotives HSM 601-647 with their three coupled axles from 1895-1907, the HSM ordered fifteen similar goods locomotives from Werkspoor, but with superheaters. These were delivered in 1912 (HSM 671-675), 1914 (HSM 676-680) and 1915 (HSM 681-685). The locomotives performed excellently.

When the fleet of the HSM and the SS was merged in 1921, the locomotives of this series were given the NS numbers 3301-3315. During the Second World War, the 3311 was taken to Germany and did not return after that. In 1950 this locomotive was administratively removed. The rest were taken out of service between 1947 and 1954 and designated for scrapping up to and including 1954.

Gallery

Sources and references 

 

 

 

Rolling stock of the Netherlands
Werkspoor locomotives
Steam locomotives of the Netherlands
0-6-0 locomotives
Nederlandse Spoorwegen locomotives
Standard gauge locomotives of the Netherlands
Hollandsche IJzeren Spoorweg-Maatschappij